The molecular formula C16H16ClN3O3S (molar mass: 365.83 g/mol, exact mass: 365.0601 u) may refer to:

 Indapamide
 Metolazone 

Molecular formulas